Foreign relations exist between Australia and Singapore. Singapore has a high commission in Canberra and Australia has a high commission in Singapore. Australia was also the first country to establish diplomatic relations with Singapore upon the independence of Singapore in 1965.

1980s 
In the 1980s, Singapore Prime Minister Lee Kuan Yew famously predicted that Australia was at risk of becoming the "white trash of Asia" due to high unemployment, inflationary pressures and government debt. At the time of the comments, Bob Hawke was Australia's Prime Minister and he stated that the comment was "not an overstatement". The white trash quote is still used today.

Trade and investment 

The two countries have a free trade agreement which came into force in July 2003.

Trade and investment is sizable between the two countries now. Singapore is Australia's fourth largest two-way trading partner, with total two-way trade valued at A$31 billion in 2008.
Australian service exports to Singapore for 2008 totalled A$3.9 billion, with service imports valued at A$4.7billion.  Australian investment in Singapore is close to A$22 billion and Singapore's investment in Australia is A$43 billion.

In June 2015, the Australian and Singaporean Prime Ministers agreed to review the 2003 Free Trade Agreement, Prime Minister Abbott stating that the government wants to increase Singaporean investment in Australia.

Foreign investment 
Singaporean company, Singtel is the owner of major Australian telecommunications company Optus. At the time of purchasing Optus in 2001, the deal was the largest event ever for a Singaporean company valued at approximately A$8.5 billion.

Agreements 
In July 2009, the peak clean energy industry bodies in Australia and Singapore signed a memorandum of understanding that will enhance commercial ties between the two countries. Australian Trade Minister Simon Crean said "This agreement sets the framework for collaboration in education, networking and information exchange in sustainable and renewable energy, and energy efficiency issues"

Diplomacy
Australia has a High Commission in Singapore, while Singapore has a High Commission in Canberra. The Australian High Commission at 25 Napier Road was built between 1976 and 1977 to a design by prominent Australian firm Godfrey and Spowers. Completed at a cost of AU$4.2 million, the high commission chancery was officially opened by the Minister for Foreign Affairs, Andrew Peacock, on 21 January 1977.

The two countries are members of the Commonwealth and each attend the Heads of Government Meeting held every two years to further Commonwealth member's relations. Separate to this, the two nations hold biennial high-level talks through the Singapore-Australia Joint Ministerial Committee. The two nations discuss economic, security and diplomatic issues with which the two countries face. Nine meetings have been held so far, the latest in 2016. In it, the ministers agreed to expand the scope of defence, security and economic ties. They stated that the two nations will work closer to achieve common goals at international organisations such as the United Nations, the G20, the World Trade Organization and the ASEAN Regional Forum.

Military cooperation 
Singapore and Australia have been partners in the Five Power Defence Arrangements since 1971. In August 2008, then Australian Prime Minister Kevin Rudd and Singaporean counterpart Lee Hsien Loong met in Singapore to sign a memorandum of understanding to strengthen bilateral defence ties. A joint statement by the Prime Ministers said that the pact aims to enhance the defence relationship between the two countries through 'expanding cooperation and sharing resources to develop military expertise'.

Former Australian Foreign Minister Stephen Smith described the two countries as having "a strong bilateral defence relationship". Singapore has also provided support to Australian Defence Force operations in Afghanistan.

In June 2015 the two nations entered into a comprehensive strategic partnership that increased defence and economic co-operation between countries. Prime Ministers Tony Abbott and Lee Hsien Loong announced the increase in co-operation during the Australian Prime Minister's visit to Singapore at a news conference, Prime Minister Lee stating that the partnership was a "road map for closer relations in trade, investment, foreign policy, defence and security." Prime Minister Abbott said he was pleased that the agreement has been formalised.

See also 
 Singaporean Australian
 Foreign relations of Singapore
 Foreign relations of Australia

References

External links 
 Singapore-Australia Free Trade Agreement

 
Bilateral relations of Singapore 
Singapore